In the 1955 Isle of Man TT the Lightweight 250cc race moved to the 10.75 miles long Clypse Course, also used for the Lightweight 125cc TT race, and the Sidecar TT, and the course was used for these races until 1959. During this period the rest of the TT program remained on the Mountain Circuit.

In the Junior TT, Norton rider Bob McIntyre led for four of the seven laps, but brake overheating and suspension problems forced him to slow, allowing Bill Lomas on a Moto Guzzi to pass, and go on to victory.

Senior TT (500 cc) classification

Junior TT (350 cc) classification

Lightweight TT (250 cc) classification

Ultra-Lightweight TT (125 cc) classification

Sidecar TT classification

Non-championship races

Clubmans Senior TT classification

Clubmans Junior TT classification

References

External links
 Senior and Junior TT detailed race results
 Clubman, Lightweight, and Sidecar detailed race results

Isle of Man Tt
Tourist Trophy
Isle of Man TT
Isle of Man TT
Isle of Man TT